Robert Harry Socolow (born December 27, 1937) is an American theoretical physicist and professor emeritus of Mechanical and Aerospace Engineering at Princeton University.

Education
Robert Socolow has stated his parents and teachers imbued him with Weltschmerz and  Tikkun Olam (the restoration of the world). He received his bachelor's degree in physics from Harvard College in 1959. He received his Ph.D. in theoretical physics from Harvard University in 1964. Between 1964 and 1966 he was National Science Foundation Postdoctoral Fellow in Physics, at the University of California at Berkeley and the European Center for Nuclear Research (CERN) in Geneva.

Career
From 1966 to 1971, he continued at Yale University as an assistant professor of physics. From 1971 to 1977 he was Associate Professor, Department of Aerospace and Mechanical Sciences at the Center for Environmental Studies at Princeton University. A Guggenheim Fellowship and German Marshall Fund Fellowship from 1976 to 1977 enabled him to study international energy issues at Cavendish Laboratory, University of Cambridge, U.K. In 1977 he became full professor and Associate Director of Princeton's Center for Energy and Environmental Studies. Socolow also taught in the Princeton University School of Engineering and Applied Science and the Woodrow Wilson School of Public and International Affairs.

In 2013 he became emeritus, but continues research.

Honors and awards
From 1992 to 2002 he was an editor for Annual Review of Energy and the Environment. 
He served on two committees of the National Academies: America's Energy Future and America's Climate Choices and in 2004 became lifetime national associate of the National Academy. He received the Leo Szilard Lectureship Award in 2003.

He is a fellow of the American Physical Society (elected in 1983) and of the American Association for the Advancement of Science.

Publications
John Harte; Robert H Socolow. Patient earth. New York, Holt, Rinehart and Winston, 1971, 364 pages, 9780030851032 0030865719 9780030865718.

References

1937 births
Living people
21st-century American physicists
Harvard College alumni
Fellows of the American Association for the Advancement of Science
Fellows of the American Physical Society
Yale University faculty
Princeton University faculty
Annual Reviews (publisher) editors